The Doubleman (1985) is a novel by Australian author Christopher Koch. It won the Miles Franklin Award in 1985.

References

Middlemiss.org

1985 Australian novels
Miles Franklin Award-winning works
Novels set in Tasmania
Novels set in Sydney
Chatto & Windus books